Derek Mitchell may refer to:
 Derek J. Mitchell, American diplomat
 Derek Mitchell (cricketer)
 Derek Mitchell (civil servant)